Warren Hutcherson is an American producer, comedian, and comedy writer. He has served as a producer on several successful television sitcoms.

Hutcherson wrote for Saturday Night Live for two years (1991–93) and Living Single for four years (1993–97) before he created his own sitcom for NBC, Built to Last, in the 1997 television season. After his show was cancelled Hutcherson became executive producer of The Parent Hood for its final season (1998), Moesha for two seasons (1998–2000), The Bernie Mac Show (2002–05) and Just Jordan (2006). He was also a writer and consulting producer on Everybody Hates Chris and played a supporting role in Freeloaders (2012). In 2019 he became executive producer of Raven's Home.

References

External links
 

1963 births
African-American male comedians
American male comedians
21st-century American comedians
African-American television directors
American television producers
American television directors
American television writers
American male television writers
Living people
Writers from Baltimore
Screenwriters from Maryland
21st-century American screenwriters
21st-century American male writers
21st-century African-American writers
20th-century African-American people
African-American male writers